The 2011–12 Indian cricket season was from late September 2011 to March 2012.

Overview

References 

Indian cricket seasons from 2000–01
2010 in Indian cricket
2011 in Indian cricket